Alfeu Martha de Freitas (born August 24, 1936 in Montenegro, Rio Grande do Sul), known as just Alfeu, was a Brazilian football (soccer) player, who played as a midfielder and played in clubs of Brazil and Argentina.

Clubs
 Aimoré: 1956 - 1957
 Portuguesa: 1958 - 1958
 Internacional: 1959 - 1962
 San Lorenzo: 1963 - 1964
 Grêmio: 1964 - 1964

Honours
 Campeonato Gaúcho: 1961.

External links
 Alfeu Martha de Freitas at BDFA.com.ar 

Martha de Freitas, Alfeu
Martha de Freitas, Alfeu
Martha de Freitas, Alfeu
Alfeu Martha de Freitas
Alfeu Martha de Freitas
Alfeu Martha de Freitas
Alfeu Martha de Freitas
Brazilian expatriate footballers
Expatriate footballers in Argentina
Brazilian expatriate sportspeople in Argentina